The GeForce 30 series is a suite of graphics processing units (GPUs) designed and marketed by Nvidia, succeeding the GeForce 20 series. The GeForce 30 series is based on the Ampere architecture, which feature Nvidia's second-generation ray tracing (RT) cores and third generation Tensor Cores. Through Nvidia RTX, hardware-enabled ray tracing is possible on GeForce 30 series cards.

The lineup, designed to compete with AMD's Radeon RX 6000 series of cards, consist of the entry-level and previously laptop-exclusive RTX 3050 and laptop-exclusive RTX 3050 Ti, mid-range RTX 3060, upper-midrange RTX 3060 Ti, high-end RTX 3070, RTX 3070 Ti, RTX 3080 10 GB, RTX 3080 12 GB and enthusiast RTX 3080 Ti, RTX 3090, and RTX 3090 Ti. This is the last generation from NVIDIA to have official support for Windows 7 and 8.x as the latest drivers available for this generation require Windows 10.

The GeForce 30 series began shipping on September 17, 2020. The initial launch, consisting of the RTX 3070, RTX 3080, and RTX 3090, occurred during the ongoing 2020–present global chip shortage, resulting in widespread and notable shortages of the series as a whole that lasted from the series' launch until 2022.

The GeForce 30 series was succeeded by the GeForce 40 series, powered by the Ada Lovelace microarchitecture.

Release and availability issues 

Launch day for the RTX 3080 was September 17, 2020. The lack of pre-order functionality and high demand exacerbated by the COVID-19 pandemic, and boost in scalping, resulted in a large number of online retailers struggling with the sheer number of purchases. Newegg had completely sold out as expected on Black Friday. Twitter users reported that they used bots to buy large numbers of cards to resell for higher prices.

Nvidia released a statement the following day, apologizing for the difficulties with their online store, which went down on launch day due to high traffic. On October 2, Nvidia announced that it would delay the release of RTX 3070 cards by two weeks to guarantee availability. On October 5, Nvidia CEO Jensen Huang announced delays due to supply shortages, which were expected to go on until 2021. On October 9, the company announced that all Founder's Edition graphic cards in the United States would temporarily be sold via Best Buy, while the official web store would be upgraded to improve the shopping experience. In early December, Nvidia blamed continued component shortages on Samsung wafer shortages, resulting in chip shortages, among other factors.

Shortages of RTX 30 series cards continued into 2021, and has been ongoing ever since its release. In an effort to limit purchases by cryptominers, Nvidia announced in February that the RTX 3060 cards would be able to detect algorithms for mining of the Ethereum cryptocurrency and halve the hash rate. Shortly after release, NVIDIA accidentally released a driver update which disabled the detection. In March, TechRadar reported that the shortages could continue until the third quarter of the year, in part blaming a global GDDR6 memory shortage and the cards' supply being bought out by cryptominers. In April, Hong Kong Customs and Excise seized 300 non-video CMP cards.

Nvidia officially announced new RTX 3080, RTX 3070, RTX 3060 Ti Limited Hash Rate (LHR) SKUs on May 18, 2021, which limits the Ethash mining hash rate.

Nvidia released the RTX 3080 Ti on June 3, and the RTX 3070 Ti one week later, on June 10. Both included the cryptocurrency mining hash rate limiter.

There have been multiple attempts to meet the demand. EVGA has a system designed to put people into a queue; the goal is to prevent cards from selling out quickly and decrease wait time.

Besides the Founders Edition, there are also a variety of aftermarket cards, referred to as "custom cards" by Nvidia. The graphics chip is taken from Nvidia and parts of the card are modified according to the company's specifications. Such modifications include: clock speeds, fans, heat sinks, connectors, and aesthetics. Such aftermarket cards tend to perform better than Nvidia's in-house cards, but such increased performance comes with tradeoffs in temperature and power consumption. Manufacturers include: Gigabyte, MSI, ZOTAC, Asus, EVGA, INNO3D.

Nvidia officially released the GeForce RTX 3080 12GB graphics card on January 11, 2022 and the desktop GeForce RTX 3050 graphics card on January 27, 2022. The RTX 3050 had previously only had a laptop variant that was launched on May 11, 2021 along with the laptop variant of the RTX 3050 Ti that currently still has no desktop variant. Nvidia officially released the GeForce RTX 3090 Ti on March 29, 2022.

Details 
Architectural improvements of the Ampere architecture include the following:
 CUDA Compute Capability 8.6
 Samsung 8 nm 8N process (custom designed for NVIDIA)
 Doubled FP32 performance per SM on Ampere GPUs
 Third-generation Tensor Cores with FP16, bfloat16, TensorFloat-32 (TF32) and sparsity acceleration
 Second-generation Ray Tracing Cores, plus concurrent ray tracing and shading and compute
 GDDR6X memory support (RTX 3060Ti GDDR6X Version, RTX 3070 Ti, RTX 3080, RTX 3080 12 GB, RTX 3080 Ti, RTX 3090, RTX 3090 Ti)
 PCI Express 4.0
 NVLink 3.0 (RTX 3090, RTX 3090 Ti)
 HDMI 2.1 supporting FRL6 (48 Gbit/s) transmission speed
 PureVideo Feature Set K hardware video decoding with AV1 hardware decoding

Desktop 
 Only the RTX 3090 and RTX 3090 Ti support 2-way NVLink.
 All the RTX 30 GPUs are made using the 8 nm Samsung node.
 Double-precision (FP64) performance of the Ampere chips are 1/64 of single-precision (FP32) performance.

Laptop 

 All mobile RTX 30 GPUs support fourth-generation Max-Q. The decision to enable Max-Q Technologies such as Dynamic Boost 2.0 and WhisperMode 2.0 on devices is handled by its manufacturer.
 All models feature GDDR6 memory.

See also 
 GeForce 10 series
 GeForce 16 series
 GeForce 20 series
 GeForce 40 series
 Quadro
 Nvidia Tesla
 List of Nvidia graphics processing units

Notes

References

External links 
 Official website
 Nvidia Ampere GA102 GPU Architecture whitepaper
 

Computer-related introductions in 2020
3000 series
Golden Joystick Award winners
Graphics processing units
Graphics cards
Impact of the COVID-19 pandemic on the video game industry